The Oslo Open is a defunct men's tennis tournament that was played on the Grand Prix tennis circuit in 1974. The event was held in Oslo, Norway and played on indoor courts.  Jeff Borowiak won the singles title while Karl Meiler and Haroon Rahim partnered to win the doubles title.

Finals

Singles

Doubles

References

External links
 Singles Draw
 Doubles Draw

Tennis tournaments in Norway
Grand Prix tennis circuit
Defunct tennis tournaments in Europe
Defunct sports competitions in Norway
Indoor tennis tournaments